Roanoke is an unincorporated community and census-designated place in Jefferson Davis Parish, Louisiana, United States. Its population was 546 as of the 2010 census.

The Roanoke post office was established in 1895.

Geography

Demographics

References

Unincorporated communities in Jefferson Davis Parish, Louisiana
Unincorporated communities in Louisiana
Census-designated places in Jefferson Davis Parish, Louisiana
Census-designated places in Louisiana